A clamper can mean:

 A clamper, an electronic circuit.
 A spiked plate worn on the sole of the shoe to prevent slipping when walking on ice.
 A person who applies a wheel clamp to a vehicle parked illegally or on private land.
 A person who belongs to the Ancient and Honorable Society of E Clampus Vitus.
 A character in Trolls World Tour.